Hipólito Peña Concepción (born January 30, 1964) is a former professional baseball pitcher. He pitched parts of three seasons in Major League Baseball, from 1986 until 1988, for the Pittsburgh Pirates and New York Yankees.

Career
He was drafted by the Milwaukee Brewers in 1981, and began his professional career in Butte that same year. In 1982, he was brought up to Pikeville. In 1983, he split time between Aguascalien and Beloit, and after the season was traded to the Pittsburgh Pirates, where he started with the Bradenton Pirates. In 1985, he split time between Miami and Prince William. In 1986, he started out in Nashua where he made his debut on September 1. In 1987, he sent back down to minors to play for Vancouver. Then after a good start in Vancouver, he was brought up to the Pittsburgh Pirates again. On March 30, 1988, he was traded to the New York Yankees for Orestes Destrade.

Sources

1964 births
Adirondack Lumberjacks players
Albany-Colonie Yankees players
Albany Diamond Dogs players
Beloit Brewers players
Butte Copper Kings players
Columbus Clippers players
Dominican Republic expatriate baseball players in Canada
Dominican Republic expatriate baseball players in the United States
Gulf Coast Pirates players

Living people
Major League Baseball pitchers
Major League Baseball players from the Dominican Republic
Miami Marlins (FSL) players
Nashua Pirates players
New York Yankees players
Pikeville Brewers players
Pittsburgh Pirates players
Prince William Pirates players
Tidewater Tides players
Toledo Mud Hens players
Vancouver Canadians players